Andrej Engel (10 February 1910 – 3 December 1991) was a Slovak sprinter. He competed for Czechoslovakia in the men's 100 metres at the 1932 Summer Olympics.

References

External links
 
 

1910 births
1991 deaths
Athletes (track and field) at the 1932 Summer Olympics
Slovak male sprinters
Olympic athletes of Czechoslovakia
People from Banská Štiavnica
Sportspeople from the Banská Bystrica Region